Tylenchorhynchus maximus is a plant pathogenic nematode infecting barley.

References

External links 
 Nemaplex, University of California - Tylenchorhynchus maximus

Agricultural pest nematodes
Barley diseases
Tylenchida